The men's 2003 World Amateur Boxing Championships were held in Bangkok, Thailand, from July 6 to July 13. The competition was organised by the world governing body for amateur boxing AIBA.

Medal winners

Medal table

External links 
Results
USA Boxing

World Amateur Boxing Championships
AIBA World Boxing Championships
B
Sports competitions in Bangkok
July 2003 sports events in Asia
2003 sports events in Bangkok